Two ships of the United States Navy have been assigned the name USS Upshur, in honor of individuals whose last name was Upshur.

 The first, was a Wickes-class destroyer, launched in 1918 and struck in 1945 was named for Rear Admiral John Henry Upshur.
 The second, was a Barrett-class troop ship named for Major General William P. Upshur, USMC.

References

United States Navy ship names